Man's Estate is a 1972 novel written by Australian author Jon Cleary set in the world of the British upper class. It is about a conservative British politician who survives World War II, the King David Hotel bombing, a Mau Mau attack and a horse riding accident. It was also known as The Ninth Marquess in the US.

References

External links
Man's Estate at AustLit (subscription required)

1972 Australian novels
William Collins, Sons books
Novels by Jon Cleary
William Morrow and Company books